Farhat (Arabic: فَرْحَات, farḥāt) is an Arabic male given name meaning "delight, pleasure, luckier, good luck, good fortune".

This is the male variant from the female stem given name Farha.

It may refer to:

Given name
 Farhat Abbas (born 1976), Indonesian lawyer
 Farhat Chida (born 1982), Tunisian athlete
 Farhat Hashmi (born 1957), Pakistani scholar

Surname
 Abdallah Farhat (1914–1985), Tunisian politician
 Asmahan Farhat (born 1990),  American swimmer
 Charbel Farhat, Lebanese-American academic
 Debbie Farhat (born 1954), American politician
 Ed Farhat (1926–2003), American professional wrestler, known as The Sheik
 Edmond Farhat (1933–2016), Lebanese Catholic bishop, Vatican diplomat 
 Hassan Farhat, Canadian Imam
 Hormoz Farhat, Iranian-American composer, ethnomusicologist, and emeritus professor of music
 Humayun Farhat (born 1981), Pakistani cricketer
 Imran Farhat (born 1982), Pakistani cricketer
 Jon Farhat, special effects artist

Place
 Farhat Square, (Sahat Farhat) a city square in Aleppo, Syria

Arabic-language surnames
Arabic masculine given names